In mathematics, an adjoint bundle  is a vector bundle naturally associated to any principal bundle. The fibers of the adjoint bundle carry a Lie algebra structure making the adjoint bundle into a (nonassociative) algebra bundle. Adjoint bundles have important applications in the theory of connections as well as in gauge theory.

Formal definition

Let G be a Lie group with Lie algebra , and let P be a principal G-bundle over a smooth manifold M. Let

be the (left) adjoint representation of G. The adjoint bundle of P is the associated bundle

Explicitly, elements of the adjoint bundle are equivalence classes of pairs [p, X] for p ∈ P and X ∈  such that

for all g ∈ G. Since the structure group of the adjoint bundle consists of Lie algebra automorphisms, the fibers naturally carry a Lie algebra structure making the adjoint bundle into a bundle of Lie algebras over M.

Restriction to a closed subgroup

Let G be any Lie group with Lie algebra , and let H be a closed subgroup of G. 
By restricting the adjoint representation of G to the subgroup H, 

For every h in H,  is a Lie algebra automorphism.

Since H is a closed subgroup of the Lie group G, the homogeneous space M=G/H is the base space of a principal bundle  with total space G and structure group H. So the existence of H-valued transition functions  is assured, where  is an open covering for M, and the transition functions  form a cocycle of transition function on M.
The associated fibre bundle  is a bundle of Lie algebras, with typical fibre , and a continuous mapping  induces on each fibre the Lie bracket.

Properties

The space of sections of the adjoint bundle is naturally an (infinite-dimensional) Lie algebra. It may be regarded as the Lie algebra of the infinite-dimensional Lie group of gauge transformations of P which can be thought of as sections of the bundle  where conj is the action of G on itself by (left) conjugation.

If  is the frame bundle of a vector bundle , then  has fibre the general linear group  (either real or complex, depending on )  where . This structure group has Lie algebra consisting of all  matrices , and these can be thought of as the endomorphisms of the vector bundle . Indeed there is a natural isomorphism .

Notes

References

 
 . As PDF

Lie algebras
Vector bundles